John Cecil Holm (November 4, 1904, in Philadelphia, Pennsylvania – October 24, 1981, in Westerly, Rhode Island) was an American dramatist, theatre director and actor. He is best known for his 1935 play Three Men on a Horse, co-written with George Abbott. He was often billed as Cecil Holm as an actor, reserving his full name for his writing credits.

Holm was educated at West Philadelphia High School and Perkiomen School and was a graduate of the University of Pennsylvania, where he acted in productions of the Mask and Wig organization. He worked in stock theater for three years before moving to New York and acting there.

On October 24, 1981, Holm died in Westerly, Rhode Island, at age 76.

Broadway roles

 Bloodstream (1932) as James Knox
 Dangerous Corner (1932) as Gordon Whitehouse
 Mary of Scotland (1933) as Jamie a guard
 Mr. President (1962) as Chester Kincaid
 Forty Carats (1969) as Mr. Latham

Film roles

References

External links
 
 
 

1904 births
1981 deaths
American theatre directors
Plays by John Cecil Holm
Laurence Olivier Award winners
Writers from Philadelphia
20th-century American male actors
20th-century American dramatists and playwrights
American male dramatists and playwrights
20th-century American male writers